Göbel is a surname of Germanic origin. Persons with this name include:

 Barbara Göbel (born 1943), German swimmer
 Bert Göbel (born 1963), German swimmer
 Christoph Göbel (born 1989), German footballer
 Frans Göbel (born 1959), Dutch rower
 Heinrich Göbel (1818–1893), German inventor
 Karl Göbel (1900–1945), German General during World War II
 Kristoffer Göbel (born 1978), Swedish vocalist
 Just Göbel (1891–1984), Dutch footballer
 Patrick Göbel (born 1993), German footballer
 Peter Göbel (born 1927), German skater
 Tim Göbel (born 1982), German sprinter

See also 
 Gobel (disambiguation)
 Goebel (disambiguation)
 Goebbels (disambiguation)

German-language surnames
Surnames from given names